Hellings Mwakasungula (born 5 May 1980 in Lilongwe) is a Malawian footballer, who currently plays for Silver Strikers.

International career
Mwakasungula was part of the Malawi national football team at 2010 Africa Cup of Nations. He scored a goal in a 2012 Africa Cup of Nations qualifier against Togo on 9 July 2010.

Football ban
In April 2019 he was one of four African former international footballers banned for life by FIFA due to "match manipulation".

References

1980 births
Living people
People from Lilongwe
Malawian footballers
Malawi international footballers
2010 Africa Cup of Nations players
Expatriate soccer players in South Africa
Malawian expatriate sportspeople in South Africa
Santos F.C. (South Africa) players
Malawian expatriate footballers
Moroka Swallows F.C. players
Mpumalanga Black Aces F.C. players
Association football midfielders
Silver Strikers FC players